Dolní Žďár is a municipality and village in Jindřichův Hradec District in the South Bohemian Region of the Czech Republic. It has about 100 inhabitants.

Administrative parts
The village of Horní Lhota is an administrative part of Dolní Žďár.

References

Villages in Jindřichův Hradec District